Pier Six Pavilion is a music venue located in Baltimore, Maryland. The waterfront venue is located on Pier Six of the Inner Harbor and opened in 1981.

History

The venue opened in 1981 as a temporary structure known as the "Harbor Lights Concert Pavilion", with a capacity of 3,133. In 1990, the City of Baltimore enlisted Future Tents Limited (now known as FTL Associates) to create a permanent structure. The $4.9 million renovation was completed in July 1991, now known as the "Pier Six Concert Pavilion", with an increased capacity of 4,341. In 2004, the venue was briefly known as the "Cavalier Telephone Pavilion", until the City restored its original name in 2006.

On June 15, 1998, Travis Barker played his first show with Blink 182 (as an official member of Blink 182) at Pier Six. The concert was sponsored by local radio station WHFS, as part of their 'Summer Jam' concert series.

On November 30, 2016, a contract was approved to allow Live Nation and SMG co-operate Pier Six for up to 10 years. As part of the agreement, the pavilion underwent a $4 million renovation that includes the installation of a new tent and seats. Following renovations, the venue capacity was increased to 4,600.

The naming rights of the venue were sold to the Municipal Employees Credit Union of Baltimore in April 2018, effectively changing its name to "MECU Pavilion."

Noted performers

Al Green
Avicii
B.B. King
Britney Spears
Chuck Berry
Coldplay
Diana Ross
The Doobie Brothers
Donna Summer
Erykah Badu
Etta James
Fats Domino
Goo Goo Dolls
Hall & Oates
Harry Connick Jr.
Jackson Browne
Jethro Tull
Jill Scott
Johnny Cash
Judas Priest
Pierce the Veil
Ray Charles
Steely Dan
Stevie Ray Vaughan
The Used
Tom Jones
Tracy Chapman

External links
https://www.livenation.com/venue/KovZpZAa1enA/pier-six-pavilion-events]

References

Inner Harbor, Baltimore
Music venues in Baltimore
Piers in Maryland
Event venues established in 1981
1981 establishments in Maryland